Dominique Brieussel (born 7 October 1962) is a French equestrian. He competed in two events at the 1996 Summer Olympics.

References

External links
 

1962 births
Living people
French male equestrians
French dressage riders
Olympic equestrians of France
Equestrians at the 1996 Summer Olympics
People from Enghien-les-Bains